Stephanie McLean may refer to:
Stephanie McLean (politician), politician elected to the Alberta Legislative Assembly in 2015
Stephanie McLean (model), British model in the 1970s